The 2020 season was the Cincinnati Bengals' 51st in the National Football League, their 53rd overall, and their second under head coach Zac Taylor.

For the first time since 2003, the Bengals had the first overall pick in the NFL Draft, which they used to select LSU quarterback Joe Burrow. They improved upon their 2–14 record from 2019 but were eliminated from playoff contention for the 5th consecutive year after a week 13 loss to the Miami Dolphins. The Bengals doubled their win total from the previous season but still finished with a 4–11–1 record. As well, this was the first season since 2010 that the Bengals did not have Andy Dalton as their starting quarterback, as he was released and signed with the Dallas Cowboys.

Offseason

Free agents

Unrestricted

Restricted

Signings

Releases

Draft

Undrafted free agents

Staff

Final roster

Preseason
The Bengals' preseason schedule was announced on May 7, but was later cancelled due to the COVID-19 pandemic.

Regular season

Schedule
The Bengals' 2020 schedule was announced on May 7.

Note: Intra-division opponents are in bold text.

Game summaries

Week 1: vs. Los Angeles Chargers

The Bengals began their season at home against the Chargers in what would be the debut pro game for new starting QB and first round draft pick Joe Burrow.  In the first quarter, the Bengals scored its only points when Burrow ran for a 23-yard TD to make it 7–0.  The Chargers tacked on a pair of field goals in the second quarter to make it 7-6 when Michael Badgley made them from 24 and 43 yards out for a 1-point deficit at halftime.  The Bengals then scored a pair of field goals of their own in the third quarter, when Randy Bullock made 50 and 43 yarders for a TD lead of 13–6.  However, in the fourth, the Chargers took the lead as Joshua Kelley ran for a 5-yard TD, followed up by Badgley kicking a 22-yard field goal to make it 16–13.  The Bengals got the ball back and were able to drive deep into Chargers' territory.  After a what appeared to be a TD pass from Burrow to Green was overturned due to an offensive penalty, the Bengals then brought out Bullock for the game-tying field goal to send the game into overtime.  Bullock missed the field goal wide right, losing the game for the Bengals.

With the loss, the Bengals started 0–1.

Week 2: at Cleveland Browns

After losing their regular season-opening game at home, the Bengals then traveled to Cleveland to face the Browns for Battle of Ohio Round 1.  In the first quarter, the Bengals scored first when Randy Bullock kicked a 38-yard field goal to make it 3–0.  Though, the Browns took the lead when Nick Chubb ran for an 11-yard TD to make it 7–3.  In the second quarter, the Browns went up by double digits when Baker Mayfield found O'dell Beckham Jr. on a 43-yard TD pass to make it 14–3.  The Bengals then came within 4 after Joe Burrow found C.J. Uzomah on a 23-yard TD pass to make it 14–10.  Mayfield then found Kareem Hunt on a 6-yard TD pass to put the Browns up by double digits, 21–10.  Though, the Bengals closed out the half when Randy Bullock kicked a 43-yard field goal to make it 21–13 at halftime.  In the third quarter, the Browns went back up by double digits when Chubb ran for a 1-yard TD to make it 28–13.  The Bengals drew closer with Bullock's 27-yard field goal to make it 28–16.  In the fourth quarter, the Bengals were able to get within 5 when Burrow found Mike Thomas on a 4-yard TD pass to make the score 28–23.  Though, the Browns would go back up by double digits yet again when Hunt punched the ball in for a 1-yard TD to make it 35–23.  The Bengals wrapped up the scoring when Burrow found Tyler Boyd on a 9-yard TD pass to make the final score 35–30.

With the loss, the Bengals fell to 0–2 for the second straight season and last place in the AFC North.

Week 3: at Philadelphia Eagles

With their fourth tie in 13 seasons, the Bengals improved to 0–2–1 and remained in last place in the AFC North. The Bengals also ended a 14-game road losing streak dating back to 2018.

Week 4: vs. Jacksonville Jaguars

QB Joe Burrow earned his first win as an NFL starter, throwing for 300 yards, a touchdown, and an interception. RB Joe Mixon turned in a huge performance with 151 rushing yards and two touchdowns as well as a receiving touchdown.

Week 5: at Baltimore Ravens

The Bengals then traveled to Baltimore for Round 1 against the Ravens.  After trailing 27–0, the Bengals wrapped up the scoring in the fourth quarter with Randy Bullock's 38-yard field goal to make the final score 27–3.

With their fourth straight loss to the Ravens, the Bengals fell to 1–3–1.

Week 6: at Indianapolis Colts

After a huge loss, the Bengals traveled again to take on the Colts.  From the first into the second quarter, the Bengals jumped out to a 21–0 lead when Giovani Bernard ran for a 2-yard touchdown, followed by Joe Burrow and Joe Mixon running for 2-yard and 7-yard touchdowns respectively.  Trey Burton scored a 1-yard touchdown of his own to get the Colts on the board 21–7.  The Bengals' lead increased with Randy Bullock's 47-yard field goal to make it 24–7.  The Colts scored twice to come within 3 before halftime when Burton ran for a 10-yard touchdown, followed by Philip Rivers finding Zach Pascal on a 17-yard touchdown pass to make it 24–21.  In the third quarter, the Bengals increased their lead when Bullock kicked a 55-yard field goal to make it 27-21 and the quarter's only score.  In the fourth quarter, however, it was all Colts when Rivers found Jack Doyle on a 14-yard touchdown pass, taking the lead at 28–27.  Rodrigo Blankenship then kicked a 40-yard field goal to make it 31–27.  With seconds left, the Bengals got the ball back.  However, Burrow would throw the game-losing interception, sealing yet another loss.

With the loss, the Bengals fell to 1–4–1.

Week 7: vs. Cleveland Browns

After another tough road loss, the Bengals went home to take on the Browns in Battle of Ohio Round 2.  The Bengals scored first in the first quarter when Joe Burrow ran for a 1-yard touchdown to make it 7–0.  The Browns then got on the board when Cody Parkey kicked a 43-yard field goal to make it 7–3.  The Bengals then went up by a touchdown when Randy Bullock kicked a 37-yard field goal to make it 10–3.  However, the Browns tied the game at 10-10 when Baker Mayfield connected with Harrison Bryant for a 3-yard touchdown.  Burrow and Tyler Boyd then connected for an 11-yard touchdown pass to give the Bengals a 17–10 lead at halftime.  In the third quarter, Mayfield and Harrison connected again to tie the game at 17–17 with a 6-yard touchdown pass.  Bullock kicked a 20-yard field goal to make it 20–17 in favor of the Bengals getting the lead back.  In a back-and-forth fourth quarter, the Browns took the lead when Mayfield found David Njoku on a 16-yard touchdown pass to make it 24–20.  Burrow then put the Bengals back in the lead with a 16-yard touchdown pass to Tee Higgins to make it 27–24.  The Browns moved back into the lead when Kareem Hunt caught an 8-yard touchdown pass from Mayfield to make it 31–27.  The Bengals moved into a late lead when Joe Burrow found Giovani Bernard on a 3-yard touchdown pass to make it 34–31.

Despite taking the lead with 1:06 remaining in the 4th quarter, the Bengals allowed the Browns to drive down the field and allowed Mayfield to find Donovan Peoples-Jones to score the game-winning touchdown (with a failed PAT) with 11 seconds remaining, sealing the Bengals' fate.

The Bengals lost 37–34 and fell to 1–5–1 on the season after being swept by the Browns for the second time in three years.

Week 8: vs. Tennessee Titans

After another loss, the Bengals stayed home to play against the Titans.  In the first quarter, the Bengals scored the only points to make it 3–0 when Randy Bullock kicked a 33-yard field goal.  They made it 10–0 when Samaje Perine ran for a 1-yard touchdown.  The Titans finally got on the board when Derrick Henry ran for a 3-yard touchdown to make it 10–7.  Though, the Bengals pulled away when Giovani Bernard ran for a 12-yard touchdown to make it 17–7 at halftime. After a scoreless third quarter, the Bengals got back to work in the fourth quarter when Joe Burrow found Tyler Boyd on a 7-yard touchdown pass to make it 24–7. The Titans drew closer when Ryan Tannehill found A. J. Brown on a 9-yard touchdown pass to make it 24–14. Bernard then caught a 6-yard touchdown pass from Burrow to make it 31–14.  And then Tannehill found Corey Davis on a 12-yard touchdown pass (with a failed 2-point conversion) to make the final score 31–20.

With the win, the Bengals go into their bye week at 2–5–1.

Week 10: at Pittsburgh Steelers

Coming off of their bye week, the Bengals traveled to Pittsburgh for Round 1 against the Steelers. In the first quarter, the Steelers jumped out to a 12–0 lead after 2 field goals from Chris Boswell, from 41 and 30 yards out, followed by Ben Roethlisberger connecting with Diontae Johnson on a 12-yard TD pass (with a failed 2-point conversion). The Bengals responded in the second quarter, coming within 5 when Joe Burrow found Tee Higgins on a 2-yard TD pass to make it 12–7. However, the Steelers would pull away by double digits before halftime when Roethlisberger found JuJu Smith-Schuster on an 8-yard TD pass to make it 19–7. Finally, Boswell kicked a 45-yard field goal to make it 22–7 at halftime. The Steelers scored the only points of the third quarter when Roethlisberger connected with Chase Claypool for an 11-yard TD pass to make it 29–7. In the fourth quarter, Roethlisberger and Claypool connected again for a 5-yard TD pass, putting the team up 36–7. The Bengals wrapped up the scoring of the game with Randy Bullock's 37-yard field goal to make the final score 36–10.

With their 11th straight loss to the Steelers, the Bengals fell to 2–6–1.

Week 11: at Washington Football Team

After a horrifying loss, the Bengals traveled again this time to take on the Washington Football Team.  In the first quarter, Washington scored the only points off of an Antonio Gibson 1-yard TD run to make it 7–0.  The Bengals got on the board in the second quarter when Joe Burrow found A. J. Green on a 5-yard TD pass (with a failed PAT) to make it 7–6.  They then took the lead at halftime when Randy Bullock kicked a 53-yard field goal to make it 9–7.  In the second half, it was all Washington as they would win by a final score of 20–9.

With the loss, the Bengals fell to 2–7–1.

In the 3rd quarter, quarterback Joe Burrow suffered a left leg injury and was carted off the field. In addition, it was revealed he had torn his ACL and MCL, with other damages to the PCL and meniscus and would be out for the remainder of the season.

Week 12: vs. New York Giants

After another road loss, the Bengals then went back home for a game against the Giants.  In the first quarter, the Giants drew first blood when Wayne Gallman ran for a 1-yard touchdown, making it 7–0.  The Bengals were able to tie it up when Brandon Wilson returned the ensuing kickoff 103 yards for a touchdown to make the score 7–7.  In the second quarter, the Bengals moved into the lead when Randy Bullock kicked a 44-yard field goal to make it 10–7.  The Giants would tie it up at halftime with Graham Gano's 41-yard field goal, making it 10–10.  In the third quarter, going into the fourth quarter, the Giants were able to make it 19–10 when Gano kicked 3 field goals from 40, 39, and 32 yards.  Later on in the fourth, the Bengals came within 2 when Brandon Allen found Tee Higgins on a 1-yard touchdown pass, making it 19–17.

With less than a minute left, the Bengals were able to get the offense back on the field.  However, Allen would be sacked and he fumbled the ball, giving it back to the Giants, sealing yet another loss for the Bengals.

With the loss, the Bengals fell to 2–8–1.  The team was guaranteed their fifth straight losing season.

Week 13: at Miami Dolphins

After a tough home loss, the Bengals traveled to take on the Dolphins.  They would take a 7–0 lead for the first quarter's only score when Brandon Allen found Tyler Boyd on a 72-yard touchdown pass.  However, from the second quarter on wards, the Dolphins would score the remaining points to win 19–7.

With the loss, the Bengals fell to 2–9–1 and were eliminated from postseason contention. With the Ravens' win over the Cowboys on Tuesday Night, they are also assured to finish in last place in the AFC North for the third straight season.

Week 14: vs. Dallas Cowboys

After another loss on the road, the Bengals returned home to face against the Cowboys and former Bengals QB Andy Dalton.  The Cowboys jumped out to a 17–0 well into the second quarter.  But the Bengals managed to put up a touchdown of their own, thanks to Brandon Allen finding A. J. Green on a 5-yard pass before halftime to make it 17–7.  From the third quarter onward, it would be all Cowboys scoring from there on out, making the final score 30–7.

With the loss, the Bengals fell to 2–10–1.

Week 15: vs. Pittsburgh Steelers

The Bengals salvaged a bright spot from a dismal 2020 by pulling off their first win over the Steelers since 2015.  Their first score came after Ben Roethlisberger botched a snap in the first quarter at his 19; the ensuing Bengals drive ended in a short field goal.  A missed second field goal attempt by the Bengals was followed by a JuJu Smith-Schuster fumble forced by Vonn Bell.  The Bengals led 17–0 at the half and added a third touchdown and late field goal for the 27–17 win.

With the upset win, the Bengals improved to 3–10–1 and snapped an 11-game losing streak to the Steelers which dates back to Week 8 of the 2015 season. They also beat the Steelers at home for the first time since Week 2 of the 2013 season.

Week 16: at Houston Texans

After a win at home, the Bengals then traveled to take on the Texans.  The Bengals scored first when Drew Sample caught an 8-yard TD pass from Brandon Allen to make it 7–0.  The Texans responded coming within 4 when Ka'imi Fairbairn kicked a 21-yard field goal to make it 7–3.  The Bengals increased their lead to 7 when Austin Seibert kicked a 35-yard field goal to make it 10–3.  Though, the Texans would tie it up when Brandin Cooks caught a 25-yard TD pass from DeShaun Watson, making it 10–10 at halftime.  In the third quarter, the Bengals took the lead when Samaje Perine ran for a 46-yard TD to make it 17–10.  Though, the Texans tied it up at 17-17 when David Johnson ran for a 4-yard TD.  The Bengals moved back into the lead when Allen found Tee Higgins on a 20-yard TD pass, making it 24–17.  However, the Texans closed out the quarter tying the game at 24-24 when Johnson caught a 2-yard TD pass from Watson.  In the fourth quarter, the Bengals moved back into the lead when Seibert kicked a 48-yard field goal, making it 27–24.  However, the Texans were able to take the lead when Watson found Darren Fells on a 22-yard TD pass, making the score 31–27.  Later on in the quarter, the Bengals took the lead late with Perine's 3-yard TD run to make it 34–31, followed up by Seibert's last field goal of the day from 36 yards out to make the final score 37–31.

With the win, the Bengals improved to 4–10–1 and posted back-to-back victories for the first time since Weeks 4 and 5 of 2018.  They also defeated the Texans for the first time since 2014 and for only the second time since 2008.

Week 17: vs. Baltimore Ravens

The Bengals attempted to play the role of spoiler and possibly deny the Ravens of a playoff spot, but were instead blown out 38–3, failing to post their first three-game winning streak since 2015.

With the loss, the Bengals finished their season with a record of 4-11-1.

Standings

Division

Conference

References

External links
 

Cincinnati
Cincinnati Bengals seasons
Cincinnati Bengals